Elizabeth Jones Towne (May 11, 1865 – June 1, 1960) was an influential writer, editor, and publisher in the New Thought and self-help movements.

Early life
Elizabeth Jones was born in Oregon, the daughter of John Halsey Jones. She first married at age 14, to Joseph Holt Struble. They had two children, Catherine and Chester. They divorced in 1900. She married William E. Towne and relocated to Holyoke, Massachusetts that same year.

Career
Both Elizabeth Towne and her second husband were for many years associated with the International New Thought Alliance (INTA), and served on its board in various capacities. She served as the president of INTA in 1924.

In 1926 she ran for and successfully obtained a seat on the board of aldermen, the predecessor of Holyoke's city council. She would be the first woman to do so in Holyoke, and the first married woman to obtain a position on a board of aldermen in the state, and in 1928, while ultimately losing to her opponents, became the first woman in the city to run for the office of mayor.

Towne was the founder and publisher of Nautilus Magazine, a journal of the New Thought Movement that ran from 1898 through 1953, when she brought it to a close due to her advancing age (she was 88 years old at the time). She also operated the Elizabeth Towne Company, which published an extensive list of New Thought, metaphysical, self-help, and self-improvement books by herself and writers such as William Walker Atkinson, Kate Atkinson Boehme, Paul Ellsworth, Orison Swett Marden, Edwin Markham, Clara Chamberlain McLean, Helen Rhodes-Wallace, William Towne, and Wallace Wattles.

In 2015, her book "Just How To Wake The Solar Plexus" was narrated by Hillary Hawkins and published in audiobook form.

Influence
The title page of Towne's book The Life Power and How to Use it is shown in the opening sequence of the 2006 movie The Secret, and the film presents many of the ideas that she promoted, along with those of Wallace Wattles and William Walker Atkinson.

Bibliography

In addition to the many articles and editorials she wrote for Nautilus Magazine during its 55-year history, books by Elizabeth Towne include:

Experiences in Self-Healing
Fifteen Lessons in New Thought or Lessons in Living
Happiness And Marriage
Health Through New Thought and Fasting (with Wallace Wattles)
How to Grow Success (1904)
How to Use New Thought in Home Life
Lessons in Living
The Life Power and How to Use It
Joy Philosophy
Just How to Concentrate
Just How to Cook Meals Without Meat
Just How to Train Children and Parents
Just How to Wake the Solar Plexus Elizabeth Towne Co. 1906.; repr. 1926.
Practical Methods for Self-Development: Spiritual, Mental, Physical
You and Your Forces
Your Character (reprinted as How to Read Character)

See also
 New Thought Movement
 List of New Thought writers

Further reading

References

External links 
 
 

1865 births
1960 deaths
American magazine publishers (people)
New Thought writers
Writers from Holyoke, Massachusetts
Writers from Portland, Oregon
20th-century American women writers